The 2015–16 Würzburger Kickers season is their 1st season in the 3. Liga.

Transfers

In

Out

Friendlies

3. Liga

3. Liga fixtures & results

Promotion play-off results 
On 7 May 2016, Würzburger Kickers qualified for the promotion play-off.

League table

DFB-Pokal

Bavarian Cup

Player informations
.

|-
|colspan="10"|Players who left the club during the 2015–16 season
|-

|}

Notes
1.Kickoff time in Central European Time/Central European Summer Time.
2.Würzburger Kickers goals first.

References

Würzburger Kickers seasons
Wurzburger Kickers